The Fitzroy Gardens are 26 hectares (64 acres) located on the southeastern edge of the Melbourne central business district in East Melbourne, Victoria, Australia. The gardens are bounded by Clarendon Street, Albert Street, Lansdowne Street, and Wellington Parade with the Treasury Gardens across Lansdowne street to the west.

The gardens are one of the major Victorian era landscaped gardens in Australia and add to Melbourne's claim to being the garden city of Australia. Set within the gardens are an ornamental lake, a scarred tree, a visitor information centre and cafe, a conservatory, Cooks' Cottage (a house where the parents of James Cook lived, brought from England in the 1930s),
tree-lined avenues, a model Tudor village, a band pavilion, a rotunda, the "Fairies' Tree", fountains and sculptures.

Horticulture

The most notable feature of the Gardens is the trees that line many of the pathways.

The land was originally swampy with a creek draining into the Yarra River. The gardens were initially designed by Clement Hodgkinson and planted by park gardener, James Sinclair, as a dense woodland with meandering avenues. The creek was landscaped with ferns and 130 willows, but that did not stop it smelling foul from the sewage from the houses of East Melbourne. The creek was used for irrigation of the western side of the gardens for fifty years. In the early 1900s the creek water substantially improved when sewerage mains were installed to the residences of East Melbourne.

In the early years quick growing blue gums and wattles were planted to provide wind breaks. Elm trees were planted to create avenues along pathways, which unknowingly created a pattern in resemblance to the Union Jack.

Clement Hodgkinson described the landscaping design:
...the chief desiderata were shade along the numerous paths therein forming important lines of traffic, and such dense and continuous masses of foliage as would tend to check the inroad of dust from the adjacent streets.

Consequently, in such reserves, strict adherence to the rules of landscape gardening, with regard to the grouping of trees, etc., had to be abandoned in favour of the formal lining of the paths with rows of umbrageous trees, and the planting in the background of dense masses of conifers, evergreen shrubs, fern trees, etc., small flowering shrubs and bedding flowers being merely introduced to mask the unsightly aspect of the grass in such reserves during summer

During the 1880s and 1890s many of the blue gums were removed to create more room for existing trees, as well as sweeping lawns and ornamental flowerbeds.
Sub Tropical planting became a feature of the Gardens with the creation of new planting in areas like the Mound and the Grey Street Walk.
Further major changes occurred in the 1930s and 1940s with the establishment of the Conservatory and the arrival of Cooks' Cottage in the Gardens.
In 2014 an area previously used for depot activities was reclaimed as garden space and features a major stormwater harvesting system, a café and visitor centre which provides tourism information about Melbourne as well as specific information and services for Cooks' Cottage and Fitzroy Gardens.

Heritage listing

The listing on the Victorian Heritage Register states in part:

The Fitzroy Gardens are of historical, aesthetic, architectural, scientific (horticultural) and social significance to the State of Victoria.

Why is it significant? The Fitzroy Gardens are of historical significance as one of a ring of public reserves around Melbourne established in the nineteenth century to provide respite and relaxation for the city's residents. The Fitzroy Gardens have been viewed as the flagship of this group of city gardens, which includes the Flagstaff, Treasury, Carlton and Alexandra Gardens and the Kings Domain. In a statewide context, while not as intact as the Royal Botanic Gardens or the Ballarat Botanical Gardens, the Fitzroy Gardens are an important remnant of the city's nineteenth-century garden heritage. They are also a reminder of the city's relatively large investment in public gardens, a reflection of 19th century beliefs about the moral and health benefits of green spaces in often dirty, smelly and overcrowded cities.

The Fitzroy Gardens are of social significance because, from their establishment in the early 1860s, the Gardens have been a place of relaxation, passive recreation and entertainment; the Gardens have been the people's park in the city.

Scarred tree
A scarred tree in the gardens has been preserved. The plaque at the bottom of the tree reads:

The scar on this tree was created when Aboriginal people removed bark to make canoes, shields, food and water containers, string, baby carriers and other items.

Please respect this site. It is important to the Wurundjeri people as traditional custodians of the land and is part of the heritage of all Australians.

All Aboriginal cultural sites are protected by law.

Wildlife

The gardens are home to brushtail and ringtail possums, rainbow lorikeets, ducks and microbats (small insect eating bats). They are visited at night by grey-headed flying foxes (a large nectar and fruit eating bat) and powerful owls. The presence of Australian wildlife make the city gardens especially enjoyable for overseas visitors and locals alike.

History

 1848 the Fitzroy Gardens were permanently reserved as public gardens, with title shared by the State Government and City of Melbourne. The gardens were known as Fitzroy Square until 1862, named after Sir Charles Augustus FitzRoy, a governor of New South Wales. 
 1857 James Sinclair appointed head gardener, and worked in the gardens until his death in 1881. 
 1860 responsibility for Fitzroy Gardens taken over by the Lands Department. Clement Hodgkinson, the head of the Lands Department, takes a detailed interest in the planning and development of the city parks, including Fitzroy Gardens. 
 1862 Path network established and band pavilion built
 1864 Sinclair's Cottage and Small Tudor style gate keepers lodge built
 1873 Neo-classical rotunda "Temple of Winds" built 
 1880 Removal of many Blue Gums 
 1890 Every alternate Elm tree on Avenues removed 
 1901 Nursery and stable yard transferred from centre of gardens to present site 
 1908 timber style Kiosk opened
 1915 External picket fence replaced by stone edging 
 1917 Control of gardens passed onto City of Melbourne 
 1927 Plant Managers house built 
 1930 Conservatory for displaying glass-house plants opened 

 1934 Cooks' Cottage erected after being bought, shipped to Australia, and donated by the Grimwade family. Artist Ola Cohn completes carving the Fairies Tree and donates it to the children of Melbourne.
 1940 Grey Street West (of Fitzroy Gardens) renamed Cathedral Place, resolving a century-old source of confusion
 1960 Kiosk damaged by fire 
 1960s Central section of creek piped underground 
 1964 New kiosk opened 
 1970s Eighteenth Century Cottage garden added to Cooks' Cottage

References

External links
City of Melbourne What's On
Disability information

Heritage sites in Melbourne
Parks in Melbourne
Gardens in Victoria (Australia)
1848 establishments in Australia
East Melbourne, Victoria